The Salme ships are two clinker-built ships of Scandinavian origin discovered in 2008 and 2010 near the village of Salme on the island of Saaremaa, Estonia. Both ships were used for ship burials here around AD 700–750 in the Nordic Iron Age and contained the remains of 41 warriors killed in battle, as well as 6 dogs, 2 hunting hawks and numerous weapons and other artifacts.

Discovery and excavation 

The first ship was discovered in 2008 during earth removal for infrastructure construction. An archaeological expedition has been working on the site since 2008. The second ship was discovered in 2010. There is some indirect evidence pointing to the possibility that at least one more ship is yet to be discovered during future excavations.

Location 

Description 
Both Salme ships are clinker-built and archaeologists have estimated their time of construction to be AD 650–700, and the most likely site of construction in what is now Sweden. There are signs indicating they had been repaired and patched for decades before making their final voyage. Outline of the keel of the larger vessel was preserved in humus, leading to the conclusion that it used a sail. In addition to the discovery of the keel, the irregular rows of strong rivets found on the bottom of the ship also indicate that the ship used sails. This makes it the oldest known vessel to use sails in the Baltic Sea region.

Human remains 
Skeletal remains from at least 42 individuals were discovered in the two ships. Most of them belonged to 30–40 year old males who had been killed in battle. Isotope analysis of some of the teeth, combined with the design of the buried artifacts, suggest that the men came from central Sweden. The smaller ship contained the skeletal remains of 7 individuals. There were at least 36 individuals buried in four layers in the large ship. Analyses of haplogroup testing defined the individuals as having the Y-chromosome haplogroup R1a1a1b, N1a1a1a1a1a1a, I1-M253 and mtDNA haplogroup T2b5a, V, J2a1a1a2, H10e, K1c1h, W6a, and U3b1b. The DNA analysis showed that four of the men were brothers and they were related to a fifth man, perhaps an uncle.

Grave goods 

Fragments of more than 40 swords of various types, remains of shields, spearheads and dozens of arrowheads were found in the burial. Most of them had been deliberately deformed, perhaps to discourage grave robbery.

Smaller objects included one small socketed axe, knives, whetstones, a bone comb with ornaments, a bear-claw necklace, and hundreds of gaming pieces made of whale bone and antler with six dice.

The skeletal remains of two ritually sacrificed dogs as well as hawks used for falconry were found in the burial.

Interpretations 
According to an early interpretation offered by Jüri Peets, the lead archaeologist at the site, the ships and the dead are of Scandinavian origin. According to the most likely scenario, a war party of Scandinavians attempted to carry out a raid against the Oeselians (Estonian inhabitants of the island of Saaremaa), but were attacked by Oeselian ships. The sides of the two ships contain numerous embedded arrowheads, some of which are of the three-pointed type used to carry burning materials to set enemy ships aflame. After losing too many oarsmen to the Estonian archers, the raiders pulled their ships aground and tried to defend themselves behind them. It appears that after the battle, the Oeselians allowed either the survivors or some other group of Scandinavians to ritually bury their dead. The burial is unusual because the ships were not covered with earth mounds. The site was eventually forgotten by the local inhabitants after it had become overblown by sand and covered with vegetation. The raid-hypothesis has led to a questioning of when the Viking Age began exactly. The Salme event took place 50–100 years earlier than the infamous Lindisfarne Viking raid in England in the summer of AD 793.

The original interpretation was called into question after the second, larger, ship was uncovered in 2010. It is likely that the human remains in it belonged to individuals of noble birth, as evidenced by the large number of expensive bronze sword-hilts and the complete lack of weaponry associated with commoners. The presence of dogs and hawks used for falconry indicates that the original purpose of the trip to Estonia may have been leisure or diplomacy. Peets suggests that the men may have come on a voyage from Sweden to forge an alliance or establish kinship ties when unknown parties set upon them.

Legendary background 
Snorri Sturluson relates in his Ynglinga saga that the Swedish king Ingvar, Östen's son, was a great warrior who often spent time patrolling the shores of his kingdom fighting Danes and Estonians. King Ingvar finally came to a peace agreement with the Danes and could take care of the Estonians. He consequently started pillaging in Estonia in retribution, and one summer he arrived at a place called Stein (see also Sveigder). The Estonians (sýslu kind) assembled a great army in the interior and attacked King Ingvar in a great battle. Their forces were too powerful and Ingvar fell and the Swedish forces retreated. Ingvar was buried in a mound at a place called Stone or Hill fort (at Steini) on the shores of Aðalsýsla, that is what is now mainland Estonia.

Citations and references

Cited sources

External links 

 22. March 2013, CWA 58, Archaeologists in Estonia have discovered the most extraordinary site: a mass grave comprising two Viking ship burials, world-archaeology.com
 10. June 2013, The First Vikings/ Two remarkable ships may show that the Viking storm was brewing long before their assault on England and the continent, archaeology.org
17. December 2021, Human remains, context, and place of origin for the Salme, Estonia, boat burials, sciencedirect.com

Iron Age
Archaeological sites in Estonia
Saaremaa Parish
Viking ship burials
Medieval ships
8th century in Europe
2008 archaeological discoveries
2008 in Estonia
History of Saaremaa